Perrache can refer to : 
 Perrache (quarter), a quarter of Lyon.
 Gare de Lyon-Perrache, one of the main two stations of Lyon, located in the quarter of the same name